Prime Cut is a 1972 American action crime film produced by Joe Wizan, directed by Michael Ritchie from a screenplay written by Robert Dillon, and starring Lee Marvin, who portrays a mob enforcer from the Chicago Irish Mob sent to Kansas to collect a debt from a meatpacker boss played by Gene Hackman. The picture co-stars Sissy Spacek in her first credited on-screen role as a young orphan being sold into prostitution as well as Angel Tompkins and Eddie Egan.

The film was considered highly risqué for its time based on its violence and the hint of a homosexual relationship between two brothers. Its graphic depiction of female slavery includes a scene depicting naked young women in pens being auctioned like cattle. It is also noted for its depiction of the beef slaughtering process and for a chase scene involving a combine harvester in an open field.

Plot 
A slaughterhouse process follows the unloading of cattle to the making of sausages. A wristwatch and a shoe appear on a conveyor line, making it clear that a human cadaver is processed among the cattle. A woman operating the sausage machine is interrupted by "Weenie", who has timed the machine using his watch. He wraps up a string of sausages, then marks the package with an address in Chicago.

Weenie is the brother of "Mary Ann", the crooked operator of the slaughterhouse in Kansas City, Kansas. The particular sausages that Weenie was wrapping were made from the remains of an enforcer from the Chicago Irish Mob sent to Kansas City to collect $500,000 from Mary Ann.

After the head of the Irish Mob in Chicago receives the package, he contacts Nick Devlin, an enforcer with whom he has worked previously, to go to Kansas City to collect the debt. He tells Devlin about the sausages and that another enforcer sent to Kansas City was found floating in the Missouri River.

Devlin agrees to the fee of $50,000 and asks for some additional muscle. He gets a driver and three other younger members of the Irish Mob as help, including the young O'Brien, who makes Devlin meet his mother as he leaves Chicago.

It is later revealed that Devlin and Mary Ann have a shared history involving Mary Ann's wife Clarabelle, who previously had an affair with Devlin. In Kansas City at a flophouse, Devlin finds Weenie in an upstairs room. He beats him up and tells him to inform Mary Ann that he is in town to collect the debt.

The next day, Devlin and his men drive to the prairie and find Mary Ann in a barn, where he is entertaining guests at a white slave (prostitute) auction. Devlin demands the money from Mary Ann, who tells him to come to the county fair the next day to get it. Mary Ann tells him Chicago is "an old sow, begging for cream" that should be melted down.

As they are standing by a cattle pen with naked young women offered for auction, one of them, Poppy, begs Devlin for help. Devlin takes her with him "on account." Back at the hotel, she tells Devlin her history of growing up at an orphanage in Missouri with her close friend, Violet, before they were brought to the slave auction.

At the county fair, in the midst of a livestock judging competition, Mary Ann gives Devlin a box that supposedly contains the money. When Devlin cracks the box open, he finds it contains only beef hearts. Devlin is able to escape with Poppy after Violet distracts Weenie, who claimed her after the auction.

Mary Ann's men chase Devlin, his men and Poppy through the fair. O'Brien is killed underneath a viewing stand. Devlin and Poppy run into a nearby wheat field, where they escape detection. When they try to leave the field, they are chased by a combine harvester operator. Poppy falls. They are about to be sliced up by the machine's blades, until...

Devlin and Poppy are saved by the arrival of Devlin's men in their car, which they abandon and let ram into the front of the combine. Devlin's driver shoots the combine operator. The entire car is demolished by the threshing apparatus and turned into bales of hay and metal.

They hitch a ride back into Kansas City on a truck. Devlin jumps off near the river and sends the rest of them with Poppy back into town. He enters a houseboat, the luxurious accommodation of Clarabelle, purchased for her by Mary Ann; she is there alone. He gets information on the whereabouts of Mary Ann while surmising that she was the one pushing Mary Ann to cut out Chicago. Clarabelle attempts to seduce him, but he rebuffs her. Clarabelle tells him she would be perfectly happy being a widow and joining Devlin again. He responds by setting the houseboat adrift on the river, with an angry Clarabelle aboard.

When he returns to the hotel, Devlin finds an ambulance, with one of his men being hauled away. He learns that Mary Ann's men ambushed them and took Poppy.  When he returns to Weenie's hotel to look for him, he finds that Violet has been gang-raped, apparently as a warning of what will happen to Poppy.

He and his two remaining men drive out to Mary Ann's farm to finally take care of business. On the way, Devlin takes out a Smith & Wesson M76 submachine gun from a case.

Devlin stops the car on the edge of a field of sunflowers near Mary Ann's farm. They approach the farm through the field and engage in a long gun battle with Mary Ann's men, a seemingly infinite number of identical men wearing bib overalls. Both of Devlin's men are hit. He tells them to stay behind while he advances with the submachine gun. Unable to get past Mary Ann's men, he stops a truck hauling livestock, commandeers it and uses it to ram the gate and smash into the greenhouse on the farm, demolishing it.

Devlin kills several of Mary Ann's men, then advances into the barn where Mary Ann and his brother are holding Poppy. From behind an apparently bulletproof bale of hay, he hits Mary Ann, who falls seriously injured down into a pig pen. Enraged at seeing his brother shot, Weenie runs toward Devlin, who kills him. As he dies, Weenie tries to stab Devlin with a sausage.

Devlin carries Poppy out of the barn. They pass the mortally wounded Mary Ann, flat on his back, next to a sow pen. Mary Ann taunts Devlin to kill him, telling him to finish him off, like he would an animal. Devlin tells him that since Mary Ann is a man, not an animal, he won't do that. He walks away, leaving Mary Ann to die on his back.

In the final scene, Devlin and Poppy go back to the Missouri orphanage and demand the release of the rest of the girls.  When the matron resists, Poppy knocks her out, to the approval of Devlin.  As they walk away Devlin tells her they're going back to Chicago, and when Poppy asks what it's like, he replies it's "as peaceful as anyplace anywhere".

Credits

Cast
Lee Marvin - Nick Devlin
Gene Hackman - Mary Ann
Angel Tompkins - Clarabelle
Gregory Walcott - Weenie
Sissy Spacek - Poppy
Janit Baldwin - Violet
William Morey - Shay
Clint Ellison - Delaney
Howard Platt - Shaughnessy
Les Lannom - O'Brien
Eddie Egan - Jake
Therese Reinsch - Jake's Girl
Bob Wilson - Reaper Driver
Gordon Signer - Brockman
Gladys Watson - Milk Lady
Wayne Savagne - Freckle Face

Production
Mickey Borofsky - associate producer  
Kenneth L. Evans - executive producer  
Joe Wizan - producer
Michael Ritchie - director
Robert Dillon - screenplay
Carl Pingitore - editor

Reception
Roger Ebert gave a mostly positive review to Prime Cut, rating the film 3 stars out of a possible 4. He wrote, "Prime Cut is very different from the usual gangster movie; it's put together almost like a comic strip, with all of the good and bad things that implies..."

See also
 List of American films of 1972

References

External links
 
 
 
 

1972 films
American crime thriller films
American crime action films
American action thriller films
1970s crime thriller films
1970s crime action films
1970s action thriller films
Films shot in Canada
Films set in Kansas
Films directed by Michael Ritchie
Cinema Center Films films
Films scored by Lalo Schifrin
Films about the Irish Mob
American neo-noir films
1970s English-language films
1970s American films